The Costa Rican election of 1847 took place shortly after the coup d'état that overthrew the first head of state elected in direct elections; Francisco María Oreamuno Bonilla who was formally overthrown although he had previously left office without resigning. The de facto president was José María Alfaro Zamora who was a candidate but was defeated by José María Castro Madriz.

These elections were held in two grades, first paid by all men over 20 or 18 if they were married or were teachers of some science, who chose the electors (168 in total) who voted to choose the positions in dispute. Also the electoral legislation established that, in five years, those who could not read or write won't be able to vote.

References

Elections in Costa Rica
1847 elections in Central America
1847 in Costa Rica